The Haryanvi people are an Indo-Aryan ethnic group native to Haryana, in northern India. They speak Haryanvi, a central Indo-Aryan language related to Western Hindi, as well as other similar dialects such as Ahirwati, Mewati, Puadhi and Bagri. The term Haryanvi people has been used both in ethnolinguistic sense as well for someone who is from Haryana.

History

Haryana has been inhabited since the pre-historic period. During the Bronze Age period, Haryana was part of Indus valley civilization. The ancient sites of Rakhigarhi and Bhirrana are one of the oldest sites of Indus valley civilization. In the Vedic era, Haryana was part of Kuru Kingdom during 1200 BCE.
The area that is now Haryana has been ruled by some of the major empires of India.
The Pushyabhuti dynasty ruled the region in 7th century with its capital at Thanesar. Harsha was a prominent king of the dynasty. The Tomara dynasty ruled the region from 8th to 12th century. They were defeated by Chahamanas of Shakambhari in 12th century.

 
In 1192 Chahamanas were defeated by Ghurids in Second Battle of Tarain. In 1398, Timur attacked and sacked the cities of Sirsa, Fatehabad, Sunam, Kaithal and Panipat.
In the First Battle of Panipat (1526), Babur defeated the Lodis. 
Hem Chandra Vikramaditya claimed royal status after defeating Akbar's Mughal forces on 7 October 1556 in the Battle of Delhi. In the Second Battle of Panipat (1556), Akbar defeated the local Haryanvi Hindu Emperor of Delhi, who belonged to Rewari. Hem Chandra Vikramaditya had earlier won 22 battles across India from Punjab to Bengal, defeating Mughals and Afghans. Hemu had defeated Akbar's forces twice at Agra and the Battle of Delhi in 1556 to become the last Hindu Emperor of India with a formal coronation at Purana Quila in Delhi on 7 October 1556. In the Third Battle of Panipat (1761), the Afghan king Ahmad Shah Abdali defeated the Marathas.

In 1966, the Punjab Reorganisation Act (1966) came into effect, resulting in the creation of the state of Haryana on 1 November 1966.

Distribution

Haryanvis within Haryana 

The main communities in Haryana are Jat, Ahir, Brahmin, Nai, Ror, Gujjar, Rajput, Meenas, Marathas, Saini, Agarwal, Kumhar, Chamar, Bishnoi etc. Punjabi khatri and Sindhi refugees who migrated from Pakistan had settled in large numbers in Haryana and delhi.

Haryanvi diaspora overseas 
 

There is increasingly large diaspora of Haryanvis in Australia, Canada, Singapore, New Zealand, Saudi Arabia, UAE, UK, USA, etc.

In Australia, the community lives mainly in Sydney and Melbourne, has set up Association of Haryanvis in Australia (AHA) which organise events.

In Singapore, the community has set up the Singapore Haryanvi Kunba organisation in 2012 which also has a facebook group of same name. Singapore has Arya Samaj and several Hindu temples.

Culture

Language 

Haryanvi, like Khariboli and Braj is a branch of the Western Hindi dialect, and it is written in Devanagari script.

Folk music and dance

Folk music is integral part of Haryanvi culture. Folk song are sung during occasion of  child birth, wedding, festival, and Satsang (singing religious songs). Some haryanvi folk songs which are sung by young woman and girls are Phagan, katak, Samman, Jatki, Jachcha, Bande-Bandee, Santhene. Some songs which are sung by older women are Mangal geet, Bhajan, Sagai, bhat, Kuan pujan, Sanjhi and Holi. Folk songs are sung in Tar or Mandra stan. Some dances are Khoriya, Chaupaiya, Loor, Been, Ghoomar, Dhamal, Phaag, Sawan and Gugga.

Cuisine
Haryana is agricultural state known for producing foodgrains such as wheat, barley, pearl millet, maize, rice and high-quality dairy. Daily village meal in Haryana consist of a simple thali of  roti, paired with a leafy stir-fry (saag in dishes such as gajar methi or aloo palak), condiments such as chaas, chutney, pickles. Some sweets are panjiri and pinni prepared by unrefined sugar like bura and shakkar and diary. Malpua are popular during festivals.

Clothes

Traditional attire for men is turban, shirt, dhoti, jutti and cotton or woollen shawl. Traditional attire for female is typically an orhna (veil), shirt or angia (short blouse), ghagri (heavy long skirt) and Jitti. Saris are also worn. Traditionally the Khaddar (coarse cotton weave cloth) is a frequently used as the fabric.

Cinema

The First movie of Haryanvi cinema is Dharti which was released in 1968. The first financially successful Haryanvi movie was Chandrawal (1984) which spurted the continuing production of Haryanvi films, although none have been as successful. Other films such as Phool Badan and Chora Haryane Ka followed with only about one out of twelve films being profitable at the box office. In 2000, Aswini Chowdhary won the Indira Gandhi Award for Best Debut Film of a Director at the National Film Awards for the Haryanvi film Laddo. In 2010 the government of Haryana announced they were considering establishing a film board to promote Haryanvi-language films.

Notable People

Anangpal Tomar, king
Arvind Kejriwal, politician
Babita Kumari, wrestler
Baje Bhagat, poet and writer
Bajrang Punia, Wrestler
Bansi Lal, politician
Dayachand Mayna, poet and freedom fighter
Dhruv Rathee, Youtuber
Dushyant Chautala, politician
Geeta Phogat, wrestler
Hemu, emperor 
Jat Mehar Singh Dahiya, poet and freedom fighter
Juhi Chawla, actress
Lakhmi chand, poet, folk singer
Mahavir Singh Phogat, wrestler 
Mallika Sherawat, actress
Manushi Chhillar, Miss World 2017
Major|| Mohit Sharma, Ashok Chakra recipient
Neeraj Chopra, Javelin thrower
Priyanka Phogat, wrestler
Rajkummar Rao, actor
Baba Ramdev, yoga guru
Randeep Hooda, actor
Ravi Kumar Dahiya, wrestler
Rao Gopal Dev, king
Rao tularam, freedom fighter
Ritu Phogat, wrestler
Sakshi Malik, wrestler
Saina Nehwal, badminton player
Satish Kaushik, actor, director, writer
Santosh yadav
Subhash Chandra, media entrepreneur and politician
Sunil Grover, actor and comedian
Sushil Kumar, wrestler
Vijender Singh, boxer
Vikas Krishan Yadav, boxer
Vinesh Phogat, wrestler
Virender Sehwag, cricket player
Yogeshwar Dutt, wrestler
Yuzi chahal, cricket player

References

Indo-Aryan peoples
Ethnic groups in India